Clovelly is a small beach-side suburb in Sydney's Eastern Suburbs, in the state of New South Wales, Australia. Clovelly is located 8 kilometres south-east of the Sydney central business district, in the local government area of the City of Randwick, within the Federal Division of Wentworth.

Clovelly is a mainly residential suburb on Clovelly Bay. Clovelly Beach is a small beach that sits on the end of the narrow bay. The bay is popular with swimmers. The bay is home to one of the first surf lifesaving clubs in the world, Clovelly Surf Life Saving Club, which was founded in 1906.

History

Originally known as Little Coogee, the name was changed to Clovelly in 1913. When the search for a new name began, the English seaside town Eastbourne was suggested. The president of the local progress association, Mr. F. H. Howe, suggested Clovelly, the name of a local estate owned by Sir John Robertson, which was named after the village of Clovelly on the north Devon coast, England.

William C. Greville bought , which included the whole bay frontage, for 40 pounds in 1834. The area was dominated during the nineteenth century by the grand estate of Mundarrah Towers. 
Mundarrah Towers was built for Dr Dickson in the 1860s. Samuel Bennett, who owned Australian Town and Country Journal, one of the most influential newspapers of the day, bought the property and made further grand additions. The Towers was demolished in 1926, to make way for suburban development. The Mundarrah Towers estate occupied the land around Burnie Street overlooking the western end of Clovelly Bay. Mundarrah Street honours this once grand part of Clovelly's heritage. Between Coogee and Clovelly, on the shores of Gordon's Bay, stood Cliffbrook, the home built for John Thompson. By the early twentieth century the first governor of the Commonwealth Bank owned this grand mansion which was substantially demolished in 1976. Some of the buildings of the Cliffbrook estate survive today at the corner of Beach and Battery streets. Now controlled by the University of New South Wales, these buildings were until the early 2000s occupied by the Australian Atomic Energy Commission.

Between 1871 and 1874, the northern cliff-face of Clovelly Beach, known as Shark Point, was the site of a coastal defence facility excavated from the sandstone to include barracks, a powder magazine and eventually in 1893, a 9.2-inch Mark VI British Armstrong "disappearing" gun. The subterranean barracks and gun emplacement were gradually demolished in the 1960s. This emplacement formed part of three gun emplacements originally designed to protect Sydney Harbour from a supposed Russian seaboard assault. Steel Point Battery.
  
A public infants school was operating in Little Coogee as early as 1897, in the Mission Hall of the Church of England in Varna Street. Eliza McDonnell was the teacher with an average attendance of 76 pupils. Clovelly Public School officially dates from 1913 when the Department of Education provided permanent accommodation for a public school in Arden Street, Clovelly.

Major subdivisions for domestic housing commenced in earnest in Clovelly in 1909. The local progress association argued that there were 717 houses constructed within metres of the proposed tram route that had not yet been completed. Due to these lobbying efforts, the tram-line to Clovelly was completed between 1912–1913. This allowed Clovelly to continue developing throughout the 1920s. During the Great Depression Randwick Council instituted a scheme to keep unemployed men employed by building concrete foreshores for Clovelly in an attempt to make access to the bay's foreshores easier for bathers. The Council envisaged an Olympic size swimming pool in the bay, a facility that would also keep local men employed in the worst financial times. It was also planned to build a causeway/scenic road across the entrance to the Bay but wild storms in 1938 dashed hopes of this. The remains of the causeway are still visible at low tide, forming a protective reef. The plans were controversial; the merits of this work are still debated today.

In 1907, a surf life saving brigade was formed at Clovelly, inaugurating the surf life saving tradition in this suburb that has seen numerous heroic rescues, including "the rescue off Schnapper" or "the big rescue" of Sunday 4 December 1927. Surf Life Saving has been a predominate part of the culture and heritage of this scenic coastal suburb. Competitive swimming is also a dominant part of life in this coastal location.

Today the suburb is affectionately referred to as "Cloey" by many residents and locals.

Trams

The Clovelly tram line began at Alison Road to the intersection of Clovelly and Carrington Roads in 1912, then extending to Clovelly in 1913 helping to popularise the area. This line branched from Anzac Parade at Alison Road, and ran on its own tram reservation beside Centennial Park as far as Darley Road. Here it diverged from services to Coogee, to run north along Darley Road, then turned right into Clovelly Road to run down to its terminus at Clovelly Beach. Though services ran from Circular Quay and from Railway Square (from 1923), the line closed in 1957. The tram line followed the current route of bus 339.

Commercial area
Clovelly has four small shopping precincts all on or near Clovelly Road. The largest is at the corner of Fern St and Clovelly where there are (amongst other businesses) a post office, community bank, chemist, newsagent and bottle shop. At the corner of Arden St and Clovelly Road is another small precinct including coffee shops, eateries, a general store & bottle shop. At the corner of Carrington and Clovelly Road there are a handful of shops. Close to Clovelly Beach there are shops in a small precinct where Burnie St meets Clovelly Road.

There is one beachside hotel, the Clovelly Hotel, built on some of the land once occupied by the Mundarrah Towers estate and the Clovelly Bowling Club, with coastal views and located on leased public land bordering the Waverley Cemetery.

Schools
 Clovelly Public School (although technically, it is located in the suburb of Waverley)
 St Anthony's Catholic Systemic Primary School, Clovelly

Sport and recreation
In summer, Clovelly Beach is a centre of community activity patrolled by council lifeguards on weekdays and Clovelly Surf Life Saving Club members on weekends/public holidays. In 2006 there were over 200 proficient club members rostered into 13 active patrols.

Clovelly is a popular spot for snorkelling and is famous for its enormous blue gropers.

Clovelly is represented in the National Rugby League competition, by the local team the Sydney Roosters, officially the Eastern Suburbs District Rugby League Football Club (ESDRLFC).  In winter, the Clovelly Crocodiles field over 20 junior rugby league sides in the Sydney Roosters Juniors competition and their home ground is Burrows Park. The Clovelly Eagles in 2006 fielded 18 junior rugby union sides in the Randwick/Easts Junior division.

The Clovelly Eskimos Winter Swimming Club compete against Bondi Icebergs Winter Swimming Club, South Maroubra Dolphins Winter Swimming Club, Cronulla Polar Bears Winter Swimming Club, Maroubra Seals Winter Swimming Club, Coolangatta Surf Life Saving Club, Coogee Penguins Winter Swimming Club, Bronte Splashers, Wollongong Whales and Cottesloe Crabs in the Winter Swimming Association of Australia Championships

Lawn bowls and bocce can be played at Clovelly Bowling Club, which is situated on a clifftop with a scenic backdrop.

Demographics

In the 2016 census, Clovelly had a population of 4,736 people. 67.3% of people were born in Australia. The next most common countries of birth were England 8.2% and New Zealand 2.5%. 83.2% of people spoke only English at home. The most common responses for religion were No Religion 38.5%, Catholic 25.3% and Anglican 12.7%. Clovelly's housing is higher density than much of Australia with 73.4% of dwellings being units, flats, semi-detached, terrace houses or townhouses. The national average for these housing types is 25.8%.

Notable people
 Clare Dennis (1916–1971), gold medallist in the 200m breaststroke at the 1932 Summer Olympics
 Don Furness, rugby union player
 David Gallop, former CEO of the National Rugby League
 Sel Lisle, rugby league player
 Willie Mason, rugby league player
 Dane Rampe. Australian rules player
 Luke Ricketson, rugby league player 
 Peter Ruehl (1947–2011), American newspaper columnist
 Justine Schofield, cook and television presenter
 David Walker, Catholic bishop

References

External links

Suburbs of Sydney
Beaches of New South Wales
Guide to Sydney Beaches
"Sand in our Souls - the Beach in Australian History" Leone Huntsman, MUP, 2001